Gilbert Schaller was the defending champion but lost in the final 7–5, 1–6, 6–2 against Tomás Carbonell.

Seeds

  Gilbert Schaller (final)
  Bohdan Ulihrach (first round)
  Carlos Costa (second round)
  Jiří Novák (quarterfinals)
  Alberto Berasategui (semifinals)
  Jordi Burillo (second round)
 n/a
  Jordi Arrese (first round)

Draw

Finals

Top half

Bottom half

External links
 1996 Grand Prix Hassan II draw

1996 ATP Tour
1996 Grand Prix Hassan II